The 2009 Supercopa de España was two-legged Spanish football match-up played on 16 August and 23 August 2009. It was contested by Athletic Bilbao, the 2008–09 Copa del Rey runners-up, and Barcelona, the 2008–09 La Liga and 2008–09 Copa del Rey winners, making it a rematch of the 2009 Copa del Rey Final. Barcelona won 5–1 on aggregate for their eighth Supercopa de España title.

Match details

First leg

Second leg

See also
Athletic–Barcelona clásico

References

Supercopa de Espana
Supercopa de Espana 2009
Supercopa de Espana 2009
Supercopa de España